Nationality words link to articles with information on the nation's poetry or literature (for instance, Irish or France).

Events

 January 29 – Poet Dana Gioia, who had retired early from his career as a corporate executive at General Foods to write full-time, becomes chair of the National Endowment for the Arts, the United States government's arts agency.
 February 12 – After First Lady Laura Bush invites a number of poets to the White House for this date, one of them, Sam Hamill, starts organizing a protest in which poets would bring anti-war poems. The conference is postponed, but Hamill organizes a "Poets Against the War" Web site with contributions from others. More than 5,000 poems are contributed, including work by John Balaban, Gregory Orr, Rita Dove, Lawrence Ferlinghetti and Adrienne Rich, Stanley Kunitz, Marilyn Nelson, Jay Parini, Jamaica Kincaid, Grace Paley and U.S. Poet Laureate Billy Collins. Also on the Web site, W. S. Merwin contributes the statement: "To arrange a war in order to be re-elected outdoes even the means employed in the last presidential election. Mr. Bush and his plans are a greater danger to the United States than Saddam Hussein." The new group, "Poets Against the War", organizes poetry readings for February 12 across the country, demonstrating the strong links between many established poets and left-wing pacifism.
 July 2 – In the aftermath of public controversy ignited by state poet laureate Amiri Baraka (b. 1934) reading his incendiary and anti-Semitic poem "Somebody Blew Up America" about the September 11th Attacks, and Baraka's subsequent refusals to resign from the position, New Jersey Governor Jim McGreevey signs legislation abolishing the post of Poet Laureate of New Jersey.
 Early November – Carl Rakosi celebrates his 100th birthday with friends at the San Francisco Public Library.

 The Seamus Heaney Centre for Poetry is opened at Queens University, Belfast, this year. It houses the Heaney Media Archive, a unique record of Heaney's entire oeuvre, as well as a full catalogue of his radio and television presentations. This same year Heaney decides to lodge a substantial portion of his literary archive at Emory University.
 Call: Review, an American little magazine, is founded by poet John Most.

Works published in English
Listed by nation where the work was first published and again by the poet's native land, if different; substantially revised works listed separately:

Australia

 Judith Beveridge, Wolf Notes, winner of the 2004 Arts Queensland Judith Wright Calanthe Award
 Pam Brown, Dear Deliria (New & Selected Poems), winner of the 2004 NSW Premier's Award for Poetry.
 Laurie Duggan, Mangroves
 John Kinsella, Peripheral Light
 Alison Croggon, The Common Flesh: Poems 1980–2002, Arc, 
 Geoff Page, editor The Indigo Book of Modern Australian Sonnets, Indigo (anthology)
 Chris Wallace-Crabbe, A Representative Human, Brunswick: Gungurru Press

Canada
 Derek Beaulieu, with wax (Coach House Books) 
 George Bowering, Baseball: A Poem in the Magic Number 9  (Coach House Books) 
 Di Brandt, Now You Care (Coach House Books) 
 Anne Compton, Opening the Island
 Joe Denham, Flux
 Jill Hartman, A Painted Elephant (Coach House Books) 
 Raymond Knister, After Exile. complete poems compiled by Gregory Betts (Exile, 2003)
 Dennis Lee, Un. Toronto: Anansi.
 Tim Lilburn, Kill-site, winner of the Governor General's Award
 Don McKay, Varves, a chapbook
 W.W.E. Ross, Irrealities, Sonnets & Laconics. (Exile Editions, 2003) 
 Anne Simpson Loop, shortlisted for the 2003 Governor General's Award, winner of the 2004 Canadian Griffin Poetry Prize, 
 Raymond Souster, Twenty-three New Poems. Ottawa: Oberon Press.
 Nathalie Stephens, Paper City (Coach House Books) 
 Suzanne Zelazo, Parlance (Coach House Books)

India, in English
 Hemant Divate, Virus Alert, translated from the original Marathi language poetry- by Dilip Chitre; Mumbai : Poetrywala
 Jerry Pinto, Asylum and Other Poems (Poetry in English), Allied Publishers, 
 Sudeep Sen:
 Distracted Geography: An Archipelago of Intent (Poetry in English), Wings Press, ; Leeds: Peepal Tree, ; (reprinted 2004, New Delhi : Indialog Publications, 2004)
 Prayer Flag (Poetry in English) with a compact disc and photographs; New York : Wings Press, 2003, ; Leeds: Peepal Tree, 
 Sachin Ketkar, A Dirge for the Dead Dog and other Incantations (Poetry in English), New Delhi : Sanbun Publishers
 Ajmer Rode, Selected Poems, by a Punjabi ; Third Eye Publications,

Ireland
 Rosita Boland, Dissecting the Heart, Oldcastle: The Gallery Press, 
 Ciaran Carson, Breaking News, Oldcastle: The Gallery Press,  
 Michael Coady, One Another, (poems and prose), Oldcastle: The Gallery Press, 
 Gerald Dawe, Lake Geneva, Oldcastle: The Gallery Press,

New Zealand
 Jenny Bornholdt, Summer
 Robin Hyde, Young Knowledge: the poems of Robin Hyde, edited and introduced by Michele Leggott, Auckland: Auckland University Press, posthumous

Poets in Best New Zealand Poems
Poems from these 25 poet s were selected by Elizabeth Smither for Best New Zealand Poems 2002, published online this year:  

Jenny Bornholdt
Diana Bridge
Rachel Bush
Kate Camp
Glen Colqu houn
Murray Edmond
Paula Green
Michael Harlow
David Howard
Andrew Johnston
Anne Kennedy
Michele Leggott
Emma Neale
Bob Orr
Chris Orsman
Vincent O'Sullivan
Bill Sewell
Anna Smaill
Kendrick Smithyman
C. K. Stead
Robert Sullivan
Jo Thorpe
Rae Varcoe
Louise Wrightson
Sonja Yelich

United Kingdom
 Gerry Cambridge, Madame Fi Fi's Farewell and other poems, Luath Press, 
 Vahni Capildeo, No Traveller Returns, Caribbean poet
 Ciarán Carson, Breaking News, Gallery Press, Wake Forest University Press, awarded the 2003 Forward Prize for Best Poetry Collection
 Carol Ann Duffy, The Good Child's Guide to Rock N Roll, Faber and Faber (children's poetry)
 James Fenton, The Love Bomb, verse written as a libretto for a composer who rejected it; Penguin / Faber and Faber
 Lavinia Greenlaw, Minsk, Faber and Faber
 Peter Redgrove, Sheen
 Simawe, Saadi, editor, Iraqi Poetry Today, London: King's College,

Criticism, scholarship and biography in the United Kingdom
 R. F. Foster, W. B. Yeats: A Life, Vol. II: The Arch-Poet 1915–1939, Oxford University Press 
 Matthew Campbell, editor, The Cambridge Companion to Contemporary Irish Poetry, Cambridge University Press

United States
 Dick Allen, The Day Before: New Poems (Sarabande Books)
 Mark Bibbins, Sky Lounge (Graywolf Press)
 Charles Bukowski, sifting through the madness for the Word, the line, the way (Ecco)
 Henri Cole, Middle Earth (Farrar, Straus & Giroux); a New York Times "notable book of the year"
 Cid Corman, Now/Now
 Annie Finch, Calendars
 Richard Greenfield, A Carnage in the Lovetress (University of California Press)
 John Hollander, Picture Window
 William Logan, Macbeth in Venice
 Howard Nemerov, The Selected Poems of Howard Nemerov, edited by Daniel Anderson (Swallow/Ohio University) published posthumously); a New York Times "notable book of the year"
 Mary Oliver, Owls and Other Fantasies: poems and essays
 Willie Perdomo, Smoking Lovely
 James Reiss, Riff on Six: New and Selected Poems
 Kenneth Rexroth, Complete Poems (posthumous)
 Margaret Reynolds, The Sappho History (scholarship), Palgrave Macmillan,  
 C. J. Sage, editor, And We The Creatures:  Fifty-one Contemporary American Poets on Animal Rights and Appreciation (Dream Horse Press)
 Charles Simic, The Voice at 3:00 a.m.: Selected Late & New Poems (Harvest Books)(Harcourt); a New York Times "notable book of the year"
 Tracy K. Smith, The Body's Question won the 2002 Cave Canem Prize for best first book by an African American poet (Graywolf Press)
 Rosmarie Waldrop, Love, Like Pronouns (Omnidawn Publishing)
 William Carlos Williams and Louis Zukofsky, The Correspondence of William Carlos Williams & Louis Zukofsky, edited by Barry Ahearn (Wesleyan University Press)
 Kirby Wright, Before the City (Lemon Shark Press); winner of the San Diego Book Award for Poetry

Poets included in The Best American Poetry 2003
The 75 poets included in The Best American Poetry 2003, edited by David Lehman, co-edited this year by Yusef Komunyakaa:

Jonathan Aaron
Beth Anderson
Nin Andrews
Wendell Berry
Frank Bidart
Diann Blakely
Bruce Bond
Catherine Bowman
Rosemary Catacalos
Joshua Clover
Billy Collins
Michael S. Collins
Carl Dennis
Susan Dickman
Rita Dove
Stephen Dunn
Stuart Dybek
Charles Fort
James Galvin
Amy Gerstler
Louise Glück
Michael Goldman
Ray Gonzalez
Linda Gregg
Mark Halliday
Michael S. Harper
Matthea Harvey
George V. Higgins
Edward Hirsch
Tony Hoagland
Richard Howard
Rodney Jones
Joy Katz
Brigit Pegeen Kelly
Galway Kinnell
Carolyn Kizer
Jennifer L. Knox
Kenneth Koch
John Koethe
Ted Kooser
Philip Levine
J. D. McClatchy
W. S. Merwin
Stanley Moss
Heather Moss
Paul Muldoon
Peggy Munson
Marilyn Nelson
Daniel Nester
Naomi Shihab Nye
Ishle Yi Park
Robert Pinsky
Kevin Prufer
Ed Roberson
Vijay Seshadri
Myra Shapiro
Alan Shapiro
Bruce Smith
Charlie Smith
Maura Stanton
Ruth Stone
James Tate
William Tremblay
Natasha Trethewey
David Wagoner
Ronald Wallace
Lewis Warsh
Susan Wheeler
Richard Wilbur
C. K. Williams
Terence Winch
David Wojahn
Robert Wrigley
Anna Ziegler
Ahmos Zu-Bolton II

Works published in other languages

French language

France
 Seyhmus Dagtekin, Couleurs démêlées du ciel, publisher: L'Harmattan; Kurdish Turkish poet writing in French
 Abdellatif Laabi, Moroccan author writing in French:
 L'automne promet, La Différence, coll. Clepsydre, Paris
 Les Fruits du corps, La Différence, coll. Clepsydre, Paris
 Œuvre poétique, La Différence, coll. Œuvre complète, Paris

Canada, in French
 Denise Desautels, La marathonienne, avec estampes de Maria Cronopoulos, Montréal: Éditions de la courte échelle
 2003 * Jean Royer, Demeures du silence, Trois-Rivières: Écrits des Forges / Esch-sur-Alzette: Éditions Phi

Germany
 Christoph Buchwald, general editor, and Michael Krueger, guest editor, Jahrbuch der Lyrik 2004 ("Poetry Yearbook 2004"), publisher: Beck; anthology
 Daniel Falb, Daniela Seel, and Andrew Potterof, die räumung dieser parks ("the clearance of these parks"), Kookbooks
 Bjoern Kuligk and Jan Wagner, editors, Lyrik von Jetzt ("Poetry of Now"), publisher: Dumont Verlag, featuring poetry by 74 authors born since 1965 (Lyrik von Jetzt 2) followed in 2008

Nepal

Bengali language

Bangladesh
 Chandan Chowdhury, Jabe he majhi, diksonnopur, Balaka prakash, Chittagong, Bangladesh

India
In each section, listed in alphabetical order by first name:

Bengali
 Debarati Mitra, Khonpa Bhare Achhe Tarar Dhuloy, Kolkata: Ananda Publishers; India, Bengali-language
 Mallika Sengupta:
 Purushke Lekha Chithi, Kolkata: Ananda Publishers
 Editor, Dui Banglar Meyeder Shreshtha kabita, Kolkata: Upasana
 Nirendranath Chakravarti, Bhalobasha Mondobasha, Kolkata: Ananda Publishers; Bengali-language
 Udaya Narayana Singh, Kham-kheyali, Kolkata: Ebang Mushayera

Other in India

 Gagan Gill, Thapak Thapak Dil Thapak Thapa, New Delhi: Rajkamal Prakashan; Punjabi-language
 Kynpham Sing Nongkynrih, editor, Anthology of Contemporary Poetry from the Northeast, North-Eastern Hill University; Kahsi-language
 Kanaka Ha Ma, translator, Battalike, a translation of Javed Akhtar's Tarkash from the original Urdu into Kannada; Puttur, Karnataka: Karnataka Sangha
 Kutti Revathi, Thanimaiyin Aayiram Irakkaigal ("One Thousand Wings of Solitude"), Chennai: Panikkudam Pathippagam; Tamil-language
 Malathi Maithri, Neerindri Amaiyaathu Ulagu, ("There Can Be No Earth Without Water"), Nagercoil: Kalachuvadu Pathippagam; Tamil-language
 Nilmani Phookan, Alop Agota Ami Ki Kotha Pati Ashilo, Guwahati, Assam: Students’ Store, Assamese-language
 Rajendra Kishore Panda; Oraya-language:
 Collected Poems – Sada Prusthha, Bhubaneswar: Metanym, Oraya-language
 Drohavakya, Bhubaneswar: Metanym,
 Dujanari, Bhubaneswar: Metanym,
 Vairagi Bhramar, Bhubaneswar: Metanym,
 Satyottara, Bhubaneswar: Metanym,
 Bahwarambhe, Bhubaneswar: Metanym,
 S. Joseph, Meenkaran, Kottayam: DC Books, ; Malayalam-language
 Salma, Pachchai Devathai, Nagercoil: Kalachuvadu Pathippagam; Tamil-language
 Saroop Dhruv, Gujarati-language:
 Hastkshep, Ahmedabad: Samvedan Sanskritic Manch, Ahmedabad
 Sahiyara Suraj Ni Khoj Ma, Ahmedabad: Samvedan Sanskritic Manch
 Thangjam Ibopishak Singh, Manam ("The Human Scent"), Imphal: Writer's Forum; Meitei language poet and academic
 Rustam (Rustam Singh), Rustam ki Kavitaen, a collection of poetry in Hindi,, Vani Prakashan, New Delhi.

Poland
 Ewa Lipska, Ja ("I"); Kraków: Wydawnictwo literackie
 Bronisław Maj, Elegie, treny, sny; Kraków: Znak
 Czesław Miłosz, Orfeusz i Eurydyka ("Orpheus and Eurydice"); Kraków: Wydawnictwo Literackie
 Tomasz Różycki, Świat i Antyświat ("World and Antiworld"), Warsaw: Lampa i Iskra Boża
 Eugeniusz Tkaczyszyn-Dycki:
 Daleko stąd zostawiłem swoje dawne i niedawne ciało
 Przyczynek do nauki o nieistnieniu
 Adam Zagajewski, Powrót, Kraków: a5
 Wisława Szymborska: Rymowanki dla dużych dzieci ("Rhymes for Big Kids")

Other languages
 Pope John Paul II, Roman Triptych. Meditations, Polish poet published in the Vatican City and in Italian translation (Trittico romano, Meditazioni)
 Inga Kuznetsova, Sni-Sinitsi ("Chickadee Dreams"), winner of the Triumph youth prize and the Moscow Score Award for best first book; Russia
 Marie Šťastná, Krajina s Ofélií ("Scenery with Ophelia"), Czech Republic
 Yi Sha, Yi Sha shixuan ("Yi Sha's Poems"), China

Awards and honors

Australia
 C. J. Dennis Prize for Poetry: Emma Lew, Anything the Landlord Touches
 Dinny O'Hearn Poetry Prize: Mangroves by Laurie Duggan, University of Queensland Press
 Grace Leven Prize for Poetry: Stephen Edgar, Lost in the Foreground, Duffy & Snellgrove
 Ipswich Poetry Feast: RT Edwards Awards – Open - Other Poetry First Prize, Denis Kevans, Dots Before the Eyes; Chairperson's Encouragement Award, Dan O’Donnell, Sydney's Central Station 
 Kenneth Slessor Prize for Poetry: Jill Jones, Screens Jets Heaven

Canada
 Gerald Lampert Award: Kathy Mac, Nail Builders Plan for Strength and Growth
 Archibald Lampman Award: Shane Rhodes, Holding Pattern
 Atlantic Poetry Prize: Anne Compton, Opening the Island
 Governor General's Award for English-language poetry: Tim Lilburn, Kill-site
 Governor General's Award for French-language poetry: Pierre Nepveu, Lignes aériennes
 Griffin Poetry Prize Canada: Margaret Avison, Concrete and Wild Carrot; International, in the English Language: Paul Muldoon, Moy sand and gravel
 Pat Lowther Award: Dionne Brand, thirsty
 Prix Alain-Grandbois: Danielle Fournier, Poèmes perdus en Hongrie
 Dorothy Livesay Poetry Prize: bill bissett, 
 Prix Émile-Nelligan: Jean-Simon DesRochers, Parle seul

New Zealand
 Prime Minister's Awards for Literary Achievement:
 Montana New Zealand Book Awards First-book award for poetry: Kay McKenzie Cooke, Feeding the Dogs, University of Otago Press

United Kingdom
 Cholmondeley Award: Ciaran Carson, Michael Donaghy, Lavinia Greenlaw, Jackie Kay
 David Cohen Prize: Thom Gunn (joint winner with novelist Beryl Bainbridge) (joint winners)
 Eric Gregory Award: Jen Hadfield, Zoë Brigley, Paul Batchelor, Olivia Cole, Sasha Dugdale, Anna Woodford
 Forward Poetry Prize Best Collection: Ciaran Carson, Breaking News (The Gallery Press); Best First Collection: A. B. Jackson, Fire Stations (Anvil Press)
 Queen's Gold Medal for Poetry: U. A. Fanthorpe
 T. S. Eliot Prize (United Kingdom and Ireland): Don Paterson, Landing Light
 Whitbread Award for poetry: Mark Haddon, The Curious Incident of the Dog in the Night-Time

United States
 Agnes Lynch Starrett Poetry Prize awarded to David Shumate for High Water Mark
 American Academy of Arts and Letters Gold Medal in Poetry, W.S. Merwin
 Bernard F. Connors Prize for Poetry, Julie Sheehan for “Brown-headed Cow Birds”
 Bollingen Prize for Poetry, Adrienne Rich
 Brittingham Prize in Poetry, Brian Teare, The Room Where I Was Born
 Frost Medal: Lawrence Ferlinghetti
 National Book Award for poetry: C.K. Williams, The Singing
 Poet Laureate Consultant in Poetry to the Library of Congress: Louise Glück appointed
 Pulitzer Prize for poetry (United States): Paul Muldoon, Moy Sand and Gravel
 Robert Fitzgerald Prosody Award: George T. Wright
 Ruth Lilly Poetry Prize: Linda Pastan
 Wallace Stevens Award: Richard Wilbur
 Whiting Awards: Major Jackson
 William Carlos Williams Award: Gary Young, No Other Life, Judge: Angela Jackson
 Fellowship of the Academy of American Poets: Li-Young Lee

Deaths

Birth years link to the corresponding "[year] in poetry" article:
 March 16 – Susan McGowan (born 1907), Australian poet
 June 28 – Clem Christesen (born 1911), Australian poet, founding editor of Meanjin
 July 6 – Kathleen Raine (born 1908), English poet and literary scholar
 July 8 – Subhash Mukhopadhyay (born 1919), Bengali poet
 July 9 – Josephine Jacobsen (born 1908), American poet, short story writer and critic
 July 15 – Roberto Bolaño, 50 (born 1953), Chilean fiction writer, poet and essayist, liver disease
 August 7 – F. T. Prince (born 1912), South African-English poet and academic
 September 3 – Alan Dugan (born 1923), American poet
 October 26 – Heinz Piontek (born 1925), German writer
 November 3 – Rasul Gamzatov, 80 (born 1923), Avarian/Soviet/Russian poet, "People's poet of Dagestan"
 November 27 – Talal al-Rasheed, 41?, Saudi poet
 December 12 – Fadwa Tuqan, 86 (born 1917), Palestinian poet
 December 23 – John Newlove (born 1923), Canadian poet

See also

Poetry
List of years in poetry
List of poetry awards

Notes

 "A Timeline of English Poetry" Web page of the Representative Poetry Online Web site, University of Toronto

2000s in poetry
Poetry